Andreas Olsen Sæhlie (1 August 1832 – 27 August 1895) was a Norwegian farmer, distillery owner and politician.

He was born in Vang, Hedmark. His daughter Christiane was married to Colonel Birger Eriksen. Sæhlie inherited his father's farm and distillery, which he expanded significantly. At its heights, his distillery delivered 10% of the total amount of potato-based spirits traded in Norway. He was elected representative to the Storting for the periods 1868–1870, 1871–1873, 1874–1876 and 1877–1879. As a politician he first represented the Liberal Party, and later the Conservative Party.

References

1832 births
1895 deaths
Politicians from Hamar
Norwegian farmers
Liberal Party (Norway) politicians
Conservative Party (Norway) politicians
Members of the Storting